Jose Angelo Gabriel Pangilinan Valenciano (born June 11, 1988), professionally known as Gab Valenciano, is a Filipino dancer, actor, musician, host, percussionist, drummer, choreographer, director, and commercial model. He is the son of Gary Valenciano. He was known for his YouTube videos called "Super Selfie."

He is second of three siblings by Gary Valenciano and Angeli Pangilinan. His paternal grandmother is a Puerto Rican of Italian descent. He graduated from De La Salle–College of Saint Benilde.

Personal life
Valenciano and his fiancée Tricia Centenera married in March 2015 with their wedding held in two venues: Tagaytay and Boracay. Valenciano and Centenera divorced in 2016.

Live appearances
 Guest artist, Gary V. Live @ 25, 2009
 Guest artist, Rachelle Ann Falling In Love Concert, 2009
 Guest artist, Philippine Life Insurance Association Anniversary, 2007
 Guest artist, JIL Anniversary, Hong Kong 2007
 Guest artist, JIL Anniversary, Taiwan 2007
 Gary V. US Tour first leg – guest artist, 2007
 Gary V. Pure Inspiration (5 shows) – guest artist, 2007
 Gary V. AT 23 – (series, 10 shows) – guest artist, 2006
 Gary V at the Ayala Malls (4 venues) – guest artist, 2006
 Microsoft Overseas Workers Welfare Administration Joint Launch – guest artist, Makati 2006
 Battle of the Bands – Liwasang Bonifacio, guest artist – 2006
 Philippine HipHop Finals judge/guest artist – 2005
 Skechers Street Dance Competition – host, 2005
 Guest artist, JIL Anniversary, Italy 2007
 Meg Magazine Anniversary – guest artist, 2005
 Gary V. PhilippineTour – (8 cities) guest artist, 2005
 Gary V. Soulful, Waterfront Hotel, Cebu City, guest artist, 2005
 Gary V. Hits Lucena, guest artist, 2005
 Symphony of the Heart – Araneta Coliseum, guest artist, 2005
 Gary V Hits – The Repeat! (4 shows) guest artist, 2004
 Gary V Thankful – Araneta Coliseum – guest artist, 2004
 GaryV Live! Lanao del Norte; guest artist, 2004
 Gary V. Hits Music Museum – (12 shows) guest artist, 2003

Television appearances
Tonight with Boy Abunda - talk show, guest: 2017
 I Can Do That – 2017
 ASAP – variety show, semi-regular artist: 2004–present
 Ay Robot – Sitcom, QTV 11, guest: 2007
 Hokus Pokus – sitcom/reality show, guest: 2007
 SOP Rules – variety show, guest artist: 2005, 2007
 SOP Gigsters – Sunday teen show, guest artist: 2005, 2006
 Club TV – dance show, regular host (one season): 2005
 Art Angel – children's show, guest artist: 2005
 Star Olympics 2005 – host
 MTV Pilipinas – guest artist: 2005
 MTV Aids Summit – guest artist: 2004
 ASAP Fanatic – guest artist: 2004
 Star In A Million – guest artist: 2004
 Star Circle Quest – guest artist: 2005
 Myx Mo! – guest artist: 2008
 Umagang Kay Ganda – guest artist: 2008, 2009
 The Sweet Life – guest artist: 2008, 2009
 Banana Split – cast member: 2010–2011
 The 700 Club Asia – guest: 2004–present
 Wowowin - variety show, director: 2020–2022

Awards and nominations

References

External links
 

1988 births
Living people
Pangilinan family
De La Salle–College of Saint Benilde alumni
Filipino male child actors
21st-century Filipino male singers
Filipino television personalities
Filipino television directors
People from Manila
People from Quezon City
Male actors from Metro Manila
Singers from Metro Manila
Filipino choreographers
Filipino male dancers
Filipino male models
Filipino people of Italian descent
Filipino people of Portuguese descent
Filipino people of Puerto Rican descent
Filipino people of Spanish descent
GMA Network (company) people